William Smith House, and variations, may refer to:

 Captain William Smith House, in Lincoln, Massachusetts
 William H. Smith House, in Atlanta, Arkansas
 Williams Smith House, in the National Register of Historic Places listings in Napa County, California
 William Smith House (Aurora, Colorado)
 William G. Smith House (Davenport, Iowa)
 William Alexander Smith House, in the National Register of Historic Places listings in Oldham County, Kentucky
 William S. Smith House, in Oriole, Maryland
 William F. Smith House, in Grandin, Missouri
 William Smith House (Salem, New Jersey), in the National Register of Historic Places listings in Salem County, New Jersey
 William G. Smith House (Bullock, North Carolina)
 William E. Smith House, in Selma, North Carolina
 William Smith House (Clinton, Ohio), in the National Register of Historic Places listings in Summit County, Ohio
 William R. Smith House, in Zanesville, Ohio
 William Smith House (Wrightstown, Pennsylvania)
 William P. Smith House (Stickney, South Dakota)
 William P. Smith House (Beaver, Utah), on the National Register of Historic Places listings in Beaver County, Utah
 William McNeil Smith House, in Logan, Utah, in the National Register of Historic Places listings in Cache County, Utah
 William Smith House (Hamilton, Virginia)

See also
 Smith House